The 1958 Washington Huskies football team was an American football team that represented the University of Washington during the 1958 NCAA University Division football season.  In its second season under head coach Jim Owens, the team compiled a 3–7 record, eighth in the Pacific Coast Conference, and was outscored 146 to 102.

Schedule

All-Coast

NFL Draft selections
Four University of Washington Huskies were selected in the 1959 NFL Draft, which lasted thirty rounds with 360 selections.

References

External links
 Game program: Washington vs. Washington State at Spokane – November 22, 1958

Washington
Washington Huskies football seasons
Washington Huskies football